Gregory Fromond (fl. 1380–1397) of Shoreham, Sussex was an English politician.

He was a Member (MP) of the Parliament of England for New Shoreham in January 1380 and September 1397.

References

14th-century births
Year of death missing
English MPs January 1380
People from Shoreham-by-Sea
English MPs September 1397